Blue Skies is a 1946 American musical comedy film directed by Stuart Heisler and starring Bing Crosby, Fred Astaire, and Joan Caulfield. Based on a story by Irving Berlin, the film is about a dancer who loves a showgirl who loves a compulsive nightclub-opener who can't stay committed to anything in life for very long. Produced by Sol C. Siegel, Blue Skies was filmed in Technicolor and released by Paramount Pictures. The music, lyrics, and story were written by Irving Berlin, with most of the songs recycled from earlier works.

As in Holiday Inn (1942), the film is designed to showcase Berlin's songs. The plot, which is presented in a series of flashbacks with Astaire as narrator, follows a similar formula of Crosby beating Astaire for the affections of a leading lady. Comedy is principally provided by Billy De Wolfe, and several musical numbers are performed by Olga San Juan.

Joan Caulfield was the protégé of Mark Sandrich, who directed many of the Astaire-Ginger Rogers musicals. Sandrich was originally slated to direct this film, but died of a heart attack during pre-production and Stuart Heisler was drafted in to replace him. Heisler wanted Caulfield replaced, but Crosby—who was having an affair with Caulfield—protected her.

Tap dancer Paul Draper was the initial choice to partner Crosby; however, during the first week of production Draper's speech impediment and his trenchant criticism of Caulfield's dance ability led Crosby to insist on his replacement by Astaire, who, then 47, had already decided that this would be his final film and that he would retire, having spent over 40 years performing before the public. The film was billed as "Astaire's last picture" and its very strong performance at the box office pleased him greatly, as he had dearly wanted to go out on a high note.

The reasons for Astaire's (temporary) retirement remain a source of debate: his own view that he was "tired and running out of gas," the sudden collapse in 1945 of the market for Swing music which left many of his colleagues in jazz high and dry, a desire to devote time to establishing a chain of dancing schools, and a dissatisfaction with roles, as in this film, where he was relegated to playing second fiddle to the lead. Ironically, it is for his celebrated solo performance of "Puttin' On The Ritz," which featured Astaire leading an entire dance line of Astaires, that this film is most remembered by some today.

Plot
The story is told in a series of vignettes and musical numbers that serve to show events in flashback. Our narrative link is New York radio star Jed Potter, who once was a renowned Broadway hoofer. The conceit is that he is on the air, telling his life story, which does not yet have an ending.

The tale starts just after World War I and centers on two men who became friends in the Army: rising dancer Potter and business-minded Johnny Adams.  While hardworking Potter dreams of stardom, the more laid-back and less disciplined Adams has hopes of becoming a successful nightclub owner.

In time, dancer Potter falls in love with a band singer, Mary O'Hara. He takes Mary to Adams' nightclub, where she takes a shine to Adams. Potter warns Mary that his old buddy is not the marrying kind, but she marries Adams. The union is not a happy one, despite the birth of a child. Adams' nightclub business is anything but a resounding success, and it turns out Potter was right: Adams is self-centered and unable to commit to his nightclubs, his marriage, or his daughter.

The couple divorces, and Mary tries again with Potter. The two even become engaged, but Mary can't go through with the wedding and takes off. A devastated Potter turns to booze and subsequently suffers an accident that puts an end to his dancing career. He winds up behind a radio microphone, sharing his story with his audience, hoping that wherever Mary is, she can hear him.

Cast

Production
Joan Caulfield was pulled out of the film. But Paramount changed their mind and put her back in.

Reception
In its initial release period in the US, the movie took in $5 million in rental income, making it one of the box office successes of the year. Variety gave a favorable review. "'Blue Skies' is another in the show biz cavalcade cycle and it'll spell beaucoup blue skies and black ink for any exhibitor. With Crosby, Astaire and Joan Caulfield on the marquee, a wealth of Irving Berlin songs and lush Technicolor production values, this filmusical can't miss for terrific grosses. . .Certainly, for Astaire, it's perhaps a new triumph. If he ever seriously thought of retiring, 'Skies' should postpone any such ideas...Crosby is Crosby although a slightly heftier Bing. He's the same troubadour, chirping the ditties as only Crosby does even though his waistline is somewhat more generous than behooves a juve."

Bosley Crowther of The New York Times liked it too. "So many screen exercises in the music-album line have been so cluttered up with 'biography' that it is a pleasure at last to see one in which a tune-vender's life and his music are not mutually and mawkishly abused. Such a one is the Paramount's current and cheerfully diverting "Blue Skies," which catalogues some songs of Irving Berlin without catalyzing that gentleman's career. And with Fred Astaire and Bing Crosby as its bright particular stars, everyone's probity is honored by it—especially Mr. Berlin's."

At the 19th Academy Awards, honoring the films from 1946, Blue Skies was nominated for two Oscars: Best MUSIC (Scoring of a Musical Picture) - Robert Emmett Dolan and Best MUSIC (Song) - "You Keep Coming Back Like A Song", Music and Lyrics by Irving Berlin. The awards, however, went to The Jolson Story – Morris Stoloff and "On the Atchison, Topeka and the Santa Fe" from The Harvey Girls – Music by Harry Warren; Lyrics by Johnny Mercer.

Soundtrack and dance routines
Crosby applies his famous relaxed crooning style to the many songs he delivers here. In contrast, Astaire, assisted by choreographers Hermes Pan and Dave Robel (for the "Puttin' on the Ritz" routine), delivers a series of dances which explore the theme of confrontation, both with partners and with the audience. As a result, it is one of only a few Astaire films not to feature a romantic-partnered dance.

 "A Pretty Girl Is Like a Melody": Berlin's 1919 song is presented as part of a big Ziegfeld Follies production number, an aesthetic which Astaire parodies in this partnered dance with Caulfield and others. In the first of a series of references to films he made earlier in the 1940s, he reprises a tap sequence performed atop a bar counter in the "One for My Baby" number from The Sky's the Limit (1943), this time danced down a stairway.
 "I've Got My Captain Working for Me Now": This song, composed in 1919, is performed by Crosby, backed up by Billy De Wolfe.
 "You'd Be Surprised": Another 1919 song, this time performed by Olga San Juan.
 "All by Myself": Crosby performs this 1921 song to Caulfield, who harmonizes with him in the closing phrases.
 "Serenade to an Old-Fashioned Girl": Caulfield sings this number, specially written for the film.
 "Puttin' on the Ritz": Although Berlin's 1930 song was originally written for vaudevillian Harry Richman, it has become indelibly associated with Astaire, who also recorded it for Columbia in 1930. In this tap solo with cane, which was widely billed as "Astaire's last dance", the lyrics are updated, replacing references to ritzy Harlemites with wealthy whites strutting their stuff up and down Park Avenue. The routine was produced after the rest of the film had been completed, and according to Astaire, it took "five weeks of back-breaking physical work" to prepare. It is constructed in three sections, beginning in a book-lined office with Astaire dressed in a morning suit. Here Astaire delivers the song while executing a gentle tap and cane solo in mock slow-motion, in an amusing parody of his impending retirement. The song finished, he returns to dancing at normal speed and dances around the office while executing an ingenious jumping cane routine, which relied on a concealed floor trigger mechanism. Rejuvenated, Astaire sweeps aside a pair of drab curtains to reveal a chorus of nine Fred Astaires – achieved by filming two separate versions of Astaire, repeating them four times and interleaving them. The final section of the number is a repeat of the tune with a greatly reduced tempo, which accompanies a complex routine for Astaire and chorus. In "Top Hat, White Tie and Tails" from Top Hat (1935), Astaire pretended to machine-gun his chorus dancers with his cane and loud taps. This time, Astaire joins his chorus in adopting a confrontational, at times almost menacing posture towards his audience. In 1957, on the brink of yet another temporary retirement, Astaire wittily refers back to this routine in the self-parodying "The Ritz, Roll And Rock" number from Silk Stockings.
 "(I'll See You In) C-U-B-A": A 1920 song performed as a duet by Crosby and San Juan.
 "A Couple of Song and Dance Men": A comic song and dance duet for Astaire and Crosby to a number specially composed for the film. The concept is a reworking of the "I'll Capture Your Heart" number from Holiday Inn (1942) and the comedy centres on Crosby's legendary reluctance to rehearse.
 "You Keep Coming Back Like a Song": Crosby performs this specially composed number.
 "Blue Skies": Crosby sings this 1926 ballad, the film's title song, to Caulfield.
 "Nightclub Montage": Crosby performs fragments of  "The Little Things In Life" (1930), "Not for All the Rice In China" (1933) and "Russian Lullaby" (1927).
 "Everybody Step": Crosby sings this 1921 number, followed by a brief dance for chorus choreographed by Hermes Pan. Crosby directs the chorus in the opening stages, a concept revived and further developed by Pan for the opening number of An Evening with Fred Astaire (1958).
 "How Deep Is the Ocean?": Crosby performs this 1932 song in a musing style, backed by a female quartet.
 "(Running Around In Circles) Getting Nowhere": Crosby sings this specially composed song to his daughter, played by Karolyn Grimes.
 "Heat Wave": The film's major production number features Astaire, Olga San Juan and chorus in a brightly coloured Latin-themed setting. It begins with San Juan's rendition – with the lyric "making her seat wave" toned down to "making her feet wave" – of this 1933 song, while Astaire approaches warily, using dance steps reminiscent of those used in the "Dream Ballet" number from Yolanda and the Thief (1945), followed by a partnered dance for Astaire and San Juan, and then a tap solo section for Astaire who quotes from the "Boogie Barcarolle (Rehearsal Sequence)" number from You'll Never Get Rich (1941). This solo section was shot in one take and features music specially composed by Astaire, the only time his music was used in a film. In a counterpoint to the film's opening number, this number ends with him ascending a staircase, only to fall dramatically from a precipice, ending his character's dance career.
 "Wartime Medley": Crosby performs excerpts from "Any Bonds Today" (1941), "This Is The Army, Mr. Jones" (1942) and "White Christmas" (1942) – which he had introduced in his previous film with Astaire: Holiday Inn (1942).
 "You Keep Coming Back Like a Song/Blue Skies (reprise)": Performed by Crosby and Caulfield at the film's close.

The other Berlin songs which featured only as background music in the film are, in order of use: "Tell Me Little Gypsy" (1920), "Nobody Knows" (1920), "Mandy" (1918), "I Wonder" (1919), "Some Sunny Day" (1922), "When You Walked Out Someone Else Walked In" (1923), "Because I Love You" (1926), "Homesick" (1922), "How Many Times" (1926), "The Song Is Ended" (1927), "Lazy" (1924), "Always" (1925) and "I Can't Remember" (1933).

Other Irving Berlin sings which were recorded by Bing Crosby for the film soundtrack but omitted from the released print were "Say It Isn't So", "What'll I Do", "All Alone", "Remember", "I'm Putting All My Eggs in One Basket", "Cheek to Cheek" and "God Bless America".

Bing Crosby recorded many of the songs for Decca Records. and these were also issued as a 5-disc, 78 rpm album titled Blue Skies (Decca album). "You Keep Coming Back Like a Song" was in the Billboard charts for six weeks with a peak position of #12. Crosby's songs were also included in the Bing's Hollywood series.

Reception
According to Variety the film earned $5 million in rentals in 1946.

The film is recognized by American Film Institute in these lists:
 2006: AFI's Greatest Movie Musicals – Nominated

References
Fred Astaire: Steps in Time, 1959, multiple reprints.
Larry Billman: Fred Astaire – A Bio-bibliography, Greenwood Press 1997, 
John Mueller: Astaire Dancing – The Musical Films of Fred Astaire, Knopf 1985,

Notes

External links
 
 
 
 

1946 films
Paramount Pictures films
Films directed by Stuart Heisler
1946 musical comedy films
Films scored by Irving Berlin
Films produced by Sol C. Siegel
American musical comedy films
1940s English-language films
1940s American films